MLOps or ML Ops is a set of practices that aims to deploy and maintain machine learning models in production reliably and efficiently. The word is a compound of "machine learning" and the continuous development practice of DevOps in the software field. Machine learning models are tested and developed in isolated experimental systems. When an algorithm is ready to be launched, MLOps is practiced between Data Scientists, DevOps, and Machine Learning engineers to transition the algorithm to production systems. Similar to DevOps or DataOps approaches, MLOps seeks to increase automation and improve the quality of production models, while also focusing on business and regulatory requirements. While MLOps started as a set of best practices, it is slowly evolving into an independent approach to ML lifecycle management. MLOps applies to the entire lifecycle - from integrating with model generation (software development lifecycle, continuous integration/continuous delivery), orchestration, and deployment, to health, diagnostics, governance, and business metrics. According to Gartner, MLOps is a subset of ModelOps. MLOps is focused on the operationalization of ML models, while ModelOps covers the operationalization of all types of AI models.

History

The challenges of the ongoing use of machine learning in applications were highlighted in a 2015 paper.

The predicted growth in machine learning included an estimated doubling of ML pilots and implementations from 2017 to 2018, and again from 2018 to 2020.

Reports show a majority (up to 88%) of corporate AI initiatives are struggling to move beyond test stages. However, those organizations that actually put AI and machine learning into production saw a 3-15% profit margin increases.

The MLOps market was estimated at $23.2billion in 2019 and is projected to reach $126 billion by 2025 due to rapid adoption.

Architecture 
Machine Learning systems can be categorized in eight different categories: data collection, data processing, feature engineering, data labeling, model design, model training and optimization, endpoint deployment, and endpoint monitoring. Each step in the machine learning lifecycle is built in its own system, but requires interconnection. These are the minimum systems that enterprises need to scale machine learning within their organization.

Goals 
There are a number of goals enterprises want to achieve through MLOps systems successfully implementing ML across the enterprise, including:
 Deployment and automation
 Reproducibility of models and predictions 
 Diagnostics
 Governance and regulatory compliance
 Scalability 
 Collaboration
 Business uses
 Monitoring and management

A standard practice, such as MLOps, takes into account each of the aforementioned areas, which can help enterprises optimize workflows and avoid issues during implementation.

A common architecture of an MLOps system would include data science platforms where models are constructed and the analytical engines where computations are performed, with the MLOps tool orchestrating the movement of machine learning models, data and outcomes between the systems.

See also 
 ModelOps, according to Gartner, MLOps is a subset of ModelOps. MLOps is focused on the operationalization of ML models, while ModelOps covers the operationalization of all types of AI models.
 AIOps, a similarly named, but different concept - using AI (ML) in IT and Operations.

References 

Machine learning